This is a list of music notation programs (excluding discontinued products) which have articles on Wikipedia.

For programs specifically for writing guitar tablature, see the list of guitar tablature software. For discontinued products, see list of discontinued scorewriters.

Free software 
 Denemo, a scorewriter primarily providing a front-end for LilyPond
 Frescobaldi, a GUI front-end for LilyPond. [Linux, FreeBSD, OS X and Microsoft Windows]
 Impro-Visor, a GUI- and text-based scorewriter for constructing lead sheets and jazz solos on Linux, OS X, and Windows
 LilyPond, a text-based scorewriter with several backends including PS, PDF and SVG
 MuseScore, a WYSIWYG scorewriter for Linux, Windows, and OS X
 MusiXTeX, a set of macros and fonts that allow music typesetting in TeX
 NoteEdit, a KDE scorewriter
 Rosegarden, a scorewriter for Linux
 Philip's Music Writer, a text-based scorewriter originally written for Acorn RISC OS (released as a commercial program in the 1990s), later ported to POSIX and licensed under the GNU GPL

Proprietary

Microsoft Windows 
 Capella
 Cubase Score V1-5 (first run on version numbers)
 Cubase SX
 Cubase V4-9.5 (second run on version numbers)
 Dorico
 Encore
 Finale plus the following lite versions: Allegro, PrintMusic, NotePad, Songwriter
 Forte (notation program) 
 Guitar Pro (primarily for guitars and bands, but also notates other instruments including drums)
 Igor Engraver
 MagicScore, plus Music Notation for MS Word and lite version MagicScore School and free versions MagicScore onLine and MagicScore Note
 Mozart
 Mus2
 MusEdit
 MusiCAD
 MusicEase, notates standard music, shaped notes and tablature; transposes and imports abc music.
 Music Construction Set (obsolete; was also for Apple II, Atari 400, and Commodore 64)
 Music Write
 MusicTime Deluxe
 Musink Lite, a WYSIWYM scorewriter and publication tool for Windows
 Notion
 Notation Composer
 NoteWorthy Composer
 Overture, plus lite version Score Writer.
 SCORE, one of the earliest scorewriters to be used for commercial publishing, no longer developed or sold
 ScoreCloud – Audio, manual or MIDI input analysis to musical notation, and editor
 Sibelius, Sibelius First, Sibelius Artist, and Sibelius Ultimate
 SmartScore Pro (music scanning and scorewriting. Lite versions: SmartScore Songbook, MIDI, Piano and Guitar Editions)

MacOS 
 ConcertWare (obsolete)
 Cubase Score V1-5 (first run of version numbers)
 Cubase SX
 Cubase V4-9.5 (second run of version numbers)
 Dorico
 Emagic, makers of Notator (bought by Apple in 2002; Windows version no longer developed or supported)
 Encore
 Finale notation program, plus lite versions: Finale Notepad, Notepad Plus, Songwriter, PrintMusic, Allegro
 Guitar Pro (primarily for guitars and bands, but also notates other instruments including drums)
 Igor Engraver
 Logic Pro, Logic Express (successor to Notator and Notator Logic)
 Mosaic (Mac OS 9 only)
 Mus2
 MusicEase, notates standard music, shaped notes and tablature; transposes and imports abc music.
 MusicTime Deluxe
 Notion
 Overture plus lite version Score Writer.
 ScoreCloud – Audio, manual or MIDI input analysis to musical notation, and editor
 Sibelius, Sibelius First, Sibelius Artist, and Sibelius Ultimate
 SmartScore Pro (music-scanning and music-scoring. Lesser versions: SmartScore Songbook, MIDI, Piano and Guitar Editions)

Other 
 Aegis Sonix (Commodore Amiga)
 Cubase Score V1-2 (Atari ST)
 Deluxe Music Construction Set (Commodore Amiga)
 MusicPrinter Plus (DOS)
 ScoreCloud Express – Audio, manual or MIDI input analysis to musical notation, and editor for iOS

See also 
 Comparison of scorewriters
 Comparison of MIDI editors and sequencers
 List of guitar tablature software
 List of music software

References 

Lists of software
Scorewriters